The 1959 Humboldt State Lumberjacks football team represented Humboldt State College during the 1959 NCAA College Division football season. Humboldt State competed in the Far Western Conference (FWC).

The 1959 Lumberjacks were led by ninth-year head coach Phil Sarboe. They played home games at the Redwood Bowl in Arcata, California. Humboldt State lost their first game, then reeled off a nine-game winning streak to finish with a record of nine wins and one loss (9–1, 4–1 FWC). The Lumberjacks outscored their opponents 191–137 for the season.

Schedule

Notes

References

Humboldt State
Humboldt State Lumberjacks football seasons
Humboldt State Lumberjacks football